Arne Weel (15 January 1891 – 2 October 1975) was a Danish actor and film director. He appeared in more than 50 films between 1910 and 1967. He also directed films between 1935 and 1950. He was born in Århus, Denmark and died in Denmark.

Selected filmography 
 Lace (1926)
 Sister Veronika (1927)
 Bag Københavns kulisser (1935)
 Life on the Hegn Farm (1938)
 The People of Högbogården (1939)
 Poeten og Lillemor og Lotte (1960)

References

External links 
 
 

1891 births
1975 deaths
Danish male film actors
Danish male silent film actors
Danish film directors
Danish male screenwriters
Danish film producers
20th-century screenwriters
20th-century Danish male actors
People from Aarhus